América Futebol Clube, commonly known as América, was a Brazilian football team based in Rio Branco, Acre state. They won the Campeonato Acreano twice.

History
The club was founded on 9 August 1919. They won the Campeonato Acriano in 1948, and in 1949. América eventually folded.

Achievements

 Campeonato Acriano:
 Winners (2): 1948, 1949

Stadium

América Futebol Clube played their home games at Estádio José de Melo. The stadium has a maximum capacity of 8,000 people.

References

Association football clubs established in 1919
Defunct football clubs in Acre (state)
1919 establishments in Brazil